Lo may refer to any of the following:

Arts and entertainment
 Lo!, the 
 L.O., a fictional character in the Playhouse Disney show Happy Monster Band
 Lo (film), a 2009 independent film
 Lo Recordings, a London-based record company established in 1995
 Law & Order (franchise), several related American television series created by Dick Wolf
 Lost Odyssey, a 2007 role-playing video game
 Lore Olympus, a 2018 economic
 Lore Olympus (TV series), an in-development adaptation by The Jim Henson Company

Businesses and organizations
 Legal observer, a third-party organization that monitors protests or war zones in the interest of protecting human and civil rights
 Lo Recordings, a London-based record company established in 1995
 "National confederation of trade unions" in several Scandinavian countries:
 Landsorganisationen i Danmark (Danish Confederation of Trade Unions)
 Landsorganisasjonen i Norge (Norwegian Confederation of Trade Unions)
 Landsorganisationen i Sverige (Swedish Trade Union Confederation)
 Lutte Ouvrière ("workers' struggle"), a far-left French political party
 Leigh & Orange, an architectural company in Hong Kong
 London Overground, a state-run train operating company in London, United Kingdom
 LOT Polish Airlines (IATA code LO)

Languages
 Loo language, an Adamawa language of Nigeria
 Lo-Toga language, an Oceanic language of Vanuatu
 Guro language, a Mande language of Ivory Coast
 lo, ISO 639-1 code for the Lao language

People
 Lo (given name)
 Lô, a Senegalese surname
 Lu (surname) , Chinese surnames romanized as Lo according to the Cantonese pronunciation
 Lu (surname 盧), written 卢 in simplified character
 Lu (surname 魯), written 鲁 in simplified character
 Lu (surname 路)
 Lu (surname 蘆), written 芦 in simplified character
 Luo (surname) (羅/罗 or 駱/骆), a Chinese surname often romanized as Lo
 Lhoba people, also known as "Lo", tribespeople living in Southeastern Tibet

Places
 Lo (island), of the Torres group in Vanuatu
 Kingdom of Lo, an ancient culturally Tibetan kingdom now known as Mustang in Nepal
 Lo, Belgium, a municipality in Belgium
 Lô River, a river of Vietnam
 Lake Orion, Michigan
 Lake Oswego, Oregon

Science and technology
 Lo, an obsolete genus of rabbitfishes, now included in Siganus
 "Lo", the first message to travel across ARPANET, later to become the internet
 Learning object, in education and data management
 Left only, the left channel of the stereo Left only/Right only downmix
 LibreOffice, an open-source office software suite
 Local oscillator in, for example, a superheterodyne receiver

Other uses 
 Liceum ogólnokształcące, a type of general academic high school in the Polish education system
 Loop jump, in figure skating scoring
 Lo mein, a dish